The Saukiog tribe (sometimes spelled Sickaog or Suckiaug) was a Native American people who lived in the Hartford, Connecticut vicinity around the early 17th century.

The Saukiog spoke an Algonquian dialect and were part of the Algonquian confederation. In 1636, sachem (chief) Sequassen sold their land to the British. Some Saukiog may have subsequently joined the Mattabeseck, and after 1650, the Pocumtuc tribes.

References 

Native American history of Connecticut
Native American tribes in Connecticut
Algonquian ethnonyms
Extinct languages of North America
Languages attested from the 17th century
Languages extinct in the 17th century